Chesakaki is a settlement in Kenya's Bungoma County. Many rocks and boulders in the village have yellowish dolomite with limonite staining, and occasional apatite crystals.

References 

Populated places in Western Province (Kenya)
Bungoma County